Kelil (also Romanized as Kelīl) is a village in Emamzadeh Abdol Aziz Rural District, Jolgeh District, Isfahan County, Isfahan Province, Iran. At the 2006 census, its population was 31, in 7 families.

References 

Populated places in Isfahan County